ADP-ribosylation factor 4 is a protein that in humans is encoded by the ARF4 gene.

Function 

ADP-ribosylation factor 4 (ARF4) is a member of the human ARF gene family. These genes encode small guanine nucleotide-binding proteins that stimulate the ADP-ribosyltransferase activity of cholera toxin and play a role in vesicular trafficking and as activators of phospholipase D. The gene products include 5 ARF proteins and 11 ARF-like proteins and constitute 1 family of the RAS superfamily. The ARF proteins are categorized as class I (ARF1 and ARF3), class II (ARF4 and ARF5) and class III (ARF6). The members of each class share a common gene organization. The ARF4 gene spans approximately 12kb and contains six exons and five introns. The ARF4 is the most divergent member of the human ARFs. Conflicting Map positions at 3p14 or 3p21 have been reported for this gene.

Interactions 

ARF4 has been shown to interact with Epidermal growth factor receptor and with RVxP motifs.

References

Further reading

External links